Messe Frankfurt is the world's largest trade fair, congress and event organizer with its own exhibition grounds. The organisation has 2,500 employees at some 30 locations, generating  annual sales of around €661 million. Its services include renting exhibition grounds, trade fair construction and marketing, personnel and food services.

Headquartered in Frankfurt am Main, the company is owned by the City of Frankfurt (60 percent) and the State of Hesse (40 percent).

History
Frankfurt has been known for its trade fairs for over 800 years. In the Middle Ages, merchants and businessmen met at the "Römer", a medieval building in the heart of the city that served as a market place; from 1909 onwards, they met on the grounds of the Festhalle Frankfurt, to the north of Frankfurt Central Station. The first Frankfurt trade fair to be documented in writing dates back to 11 July 1240, when the Frankfurt Autumn Trade Fair was called into being by Emperor Frederick II, who decreed that merchants travelling to the fair were under his protection. Some ninety years later, on 25 April 1330, the Frankfurt Spring Fair also received its privilege from Emperor Louis IV. And from this time onwards, trade fairs were held in Frankfurt twice a year, in spring and autumn, forming the basic structure for Messe Frankfurt's modern consumer goods fairs.

Frankfurt Trade Fair

Location and size 

Public transit 
 air: Frankfurt Airport
 rail: Frankfurt (Main) Hauptbahnhof (On foot: 20 min)
 Rhine-Main S-Bahn:     Frankfurt Messe station
 underground:  Festhalle/Messe
 tram:  16 17 Festhalle/Messe

Architecture 
Notable architects of the exhibition ground were Helmut Jahn (Messeturm), Oswald Mathias Ungers (Messe Torhaus) and Nicholas Grimshaw (Frankfurt Trade Fair Hall). The company operates two congress centres, the Congress Center and Kap Europa,. Hall 12 is the newest and ultramodern hall. From 2023 onwards, the new Hall 5 will be ready.

Gallery

References

External links 

 

Economy of Frankfurt
Trade fairs in Germany
Convention centres in Germany
Tourist attractions in Frankfurt
Event management companies of Germany